The 2013 Eneco Tour was the ninth running of the Eneco Tour cycling stage race. It started on 12 August in Koksijde and ended on 18 August in Geraardsbergen, Belgium, after seven stages. It was the 20th race of the 2013 UCI World Tour season and was won by Zdeněk Štybar.

Teams
All 19 teams in the UCI's Proteam category were entitled, and obliged, to enter the race.  Two UCI Professional Continental teams were also invited.

†

†

†: Invited Pro-Continental teams

Schedule
The race consists of seven stages, including one individual time trial stage. Just as the previous season, the race will finish with a stage including the Muur van Geraardsbergen, which was famous for its presence in the Tour of Flanders single-day race.

Stages

Stage 1
12 August 2013 — Koksijde (Belgium) to Ardooie (Belgium),

Stage 2
13 August 2013 — Ardooie (Belgium) to Vorst (Belgium),

Stage 3
14 August 2013 — Oosterhout (Netherlands) to Brouwersdam (Netherlands),

Stage 4
15 August 2013 — Essen (Belgium) to Vlijmen (Netherlands),

Stage 5
16 August 2013 — Sittard-Geleen (Netherlands) to Sittard-Geleen (Netherlands), individual time trial (ITT)

Stage 6
17 August 2013 — Riemst (Belgium) to La Redoute (Belgium),

Stage 7
18 August 2013 — Tienen (Belgium) to Geraardsbergen (Belgium),

Classification leadership table

References

External links

Eneco Tour
Benelux Tour
Eneco Tour
Eneco Tour